Heishanobaatar is an extinct genus of eobaatarid multituberculate which existed in Shahai and Fuxin formations, northeastern China, during the early Cretaceous (Aptian/Albian age). It was first named by Nao Kusuhashi, Yaoming Hu, Yuanqing Wang, Takeshi Setoguchi and Hiroshige Marsuoka in 2010 and the type species is Heishanobaatar triangulus. Known from dentaries, lower incisors, and premolars, Heishanobaatar is distinguished by its laterally triangular third premolar, from which its species name is derived. Its referral to Eobaataridae was considered questionable by Kusuhashi et al. 2019.

References

Cretaceous mammals
Multituberculates
Fossil taxa described in 2010
Fossils of China
Prehistoric mammal genera